Eishōsai Chōki, also known as Momokawa Chōki, was a designer of ukiyo-e style Japanese woodblock prints who was active from about 1786 to 1808.  He, along with Utamaro, was a pupil of Toriyama Sekien (1712–1788).  Chōki is best known for his pictures of beautiful slender women (bijin-ga), often with atmospheric backgrounds.

The artist signed most of his works Chōki, he also signed some work Eishōsai or Shikō.

Life and career

The details of Chōki's life are obscure.  He was likely a student—and possibly an adopted son—of Toriyama Sekien.  Chōki specialized in depicting beautiful women and had a number of art names: works signed Chōki were in the style similar to that of Kiyonaga, and those signed Shikō that of Utamaro.

Chōki lived in the home of publisher Tsutaya Jūzaburō, who published several of Chōki's print series.  Amongst Chōki's more popular series were the Eight Views of Lake Ōmi (Ōmi hakkei) and the Eight Views of the Treasury of Loyal Retainers (Chūshingura hakkei).  He also produced hashira-e pillar prints, kachō-e prints of birds and flowers, and book illustrations.  His last known work is the illustrations for the book Nakoso Gate (Nakoso no seki) by Kanwatei Onitake in 1809.

Gallery

References

Works cited

Further reading

 Hiller, Jack (1960) "Choki: What is a Minor Artist?". In: The Japanese Print: A New Approach, Rutland, Tuttle. 94–101.
 Lane, Richard. (1978).  Images from the Floating World, The Japanese Print. Oxford: Oxford University Press. ; OCLC 5246796
 Newland, Amy Reigle. (2005). Hotei Encyclopedia of Japanese Woodblock Prints.  Amsterdam: Hotei. ; OCLC 61666175 
 Roberts, Laurance P. (1976). A Dictionary of Japanese Artists. New York: Weatherhill. ; OCLC 2005932

External links
 

Ukiyo-e artists
Year of birth missing
Year of death missing